Ciudad del Cine is a station on Line 3 of the Metro Ligero. It is located in fare Zone A.

References 

Madrid Metro Ligero stations
Buildings and structures in Pozuelo de Alarcón
Railway stations in Spain opened in 2007